Tapinoma madeirense is a species of ant in the genus Tapinoma. Described by Forel in 1895, the species is endemic to various countries to many countries throughout Europe.

References

Tapinoma
Insects of Europe
Insects described in 1895